Alex Whittle (born 15 March 1993) is an English professional footballer who plays as a left-back for York City. He has played for Dunfermline Athletic, AFC Fylde, Southport, York City, Forest Green Rovers, Southport, Boston United, Gloucester City and Chesterfield.

Club career
Whittle was born in Liverpool, Merseyside and attended Maricourt Catholic School in Maghull, Merseyside. He started his career at Liverpool where he joined as a six-year-old, and spent 11 years at the club before being released in early 2011. He then joined the Glenn Hoddle Academy in Spain in February 2011 and the Nike Academy for the 2011–12 season, where he went on trial to Brighton & Hove Albion, Heart of Midlothian and Dunfermline Athletic.

He joined Dunfermline Athletic on a pre-contract in April 2012 ahead of signing a three-year contract. He made his debut on 28 July in a Scottish Challenge Cup match against Forfar Athletic and his Scottish Football League debut on 11 August in a 4–0 victory against Cowdenbeath. Whittle was signed as a winger and made sporadic appearances, often as a substitute, but got his break in the first team at left-back following the redundancy of Stephen Jordan amid Dunfermline's administration. He scored his first goal for Dunfermline against Ayr United on 28 September 2013. After being released by Dunfermline at the end of 2014–15, Whittle appeared as a trialist for Hartlepool United in a friendly match against Spennymoor Town. Hartlepool manager Ronnie Moore commented that he was "pleased" with Whittle's performance, adding that he had asked Whittle to stay with the club for an extra week in order to assess him.

In September 2015, Whittle signed for National League North club AFC Fylde, making his debut as a substitute in a 2–2 draw with Tamworth. On 23 March 2016, Whittle signed for National League club Southport, debuting three days later as a 33rd-minute substitute in a 2–0 home win over Guiseley. He made seven appearances for Southport over the remainder of 2015–16.

On 23 May 2016, Whittle signed for newly relegated National League club York City on a one-year contract, with the option of a further year.

On 29 December 2017, Whittle agreed to sign for League Two club Forest Green Rovers on a free transfer on 1 January 2018. He joined National League North club Southport on 15 March 2018 on a one-month loan, having struggled with a hamstring injury after joining Forest Green. He was released by Forest Green at the end of 2017–18.

Whittle signed for Northern Premier League Premier Division club Warrington Town in September 2018 and made his debut in a 3–0 home win over South Shields on 29 September in the league. Although they would go on to win the play-offs, they were denied promotion after losing to Southern League Central playoff champions King's Lynn Town.

In June 2019, Whittle joined Boston United.

Whittle joined Gloucester City in August 2020. On 8 January 2021, he departed from Gloucester, joining Chesterfield later that day, following the path of former manager at Gloucester James Rowe and former teammates Akwasi Asante and George Carline. Whittle was released by Chesterfield at the end of the 2021–22 season.

On 2 July 2022, Whittle returned to newly promoted National League club York City.

International career
Whittle was capped by the England schools team over 2008–09.

Career statistics

References

External links

1993 births
Living people
Footballers from Liverpool
English footballers
England schools international footballers
Association football defenders
Liverpool F.C. players
Dunfermline Athletic F.C. players
AFC Fylde players
Southport F.C. players
York City F.C. players
Forest Green Rovers F.C. players
Warrington Town F.C. players
Boston United F.C. players
Gloucester City A.F.C. players
Chesterfield F.C. players
Scottish Football League players
Scottish Professional Football League players
National League (English football) players
English Football League players
Northern Premier League players